Omar Eddahri (born 30 August 1990) is a Swedish footballer. He can play as a winger, attacking midfielder or striker.

Eddahri is known for his dribbling ability, taking on players with his speed. Eddahri started his career with Sundbybergs IK, Rissne IF, Vasalunds IF and Djurgårdens IF in their youth system, before joining Täby IS, Väsby United, Akropolis IF, Sollentuna United, Sollentuna FK between 2008 and 2014.

From 2014–2018 he played for AFC Eskilstuna formally known as AFC United, there he achieved promotions as Champions to the Superettan in 2014 and second-place in 2016 to the top-tier of the Swedish Allsvenskan league. After four years there, he joined Allsvenskan side IK Sirius for six games.

Club career
Eddahri was born in Rissne, Stockholm, Sweden; he started his career playing as a junior for Sundbybergs IK, Rissne IF, Vasalunds IF and Djurgårdens IF. Eddahri played for Täby IS, Väsby United, Akropolis IF, Sollentuna United, Sollentuna FK between 2008 and 2014. While playing for Sollentuna United in September 2011, he went to Spain for one week for a trial with La Liga side Sevilla.

AFC United / AFC Eskilstuna
Eddahri signed for AFC United in April 2014. He made his debut in a 2–1 defeat at IK Brage on 21 April 2014. He earned promotion into the Superettan as Champions with AFC United in October 2014. In February 2016, Eddahri signed a new two-year contract with the club being renamed AFC Eskilstuna. In November 2016, he won promotion again with AFC United in second-place, only losing out as Champions on goal difference. During his four years at AFC United/AFC Eskilstuna, he was their club captain.

Eddahris intentions were to play abroad in the near future, he was reported to be amidst much transfer speculation with clubs in England, Turkey and Sweden reportedly scouting; in June 2017 EFL Championship side Fulham and TFF First League Eskişehirspor amongst other clubs watching the forward. In February 2018, A-League side Melbourne City were interested in signing Eddahri on a short term deal. Manager Warren Joyce had been in dialogue with Eddahri.

IK Sirius
On 5 March 2018, Eddahri signed a one-year contract with Allsvenskan side IK Sirius. After playing six matches for IK Sirius, Eddahri left the club by mutual agreement on 30 May 2018.

IR Tanger
On 12 June, Eddahri signed a three-year contract with Moroccan Botola club Ittihad Tanger. On 25 July, the club announces the termination the contract of the player at his request.

Djurgårdens IF
On 9 August 2018, Eddahri signed a short-term contract with Djurgårdens IF, a club that he played with as a junior. The contract will run through the end of the 2018 Allsvenskan season.

Personal life
Eddahri was born in Sweden, he's of Moroccan descent and eligible to play for either Sweden, or the Morocco national football team respectively having already had dialogue with Morocco. Eddahri has many relatives that live in France and has visited numerous times.

Career statistics

Honours

Club
AFC United
Division 1 Norra Champions: 2014
Superettan second-place promotion: 2016

References

External links
   (archive)
 

1990 births
Living people
Swedish people of Moroccan descent
Footballers from Stockholm
Swedish footballers
Expatriate footballers in Morocco
Association football wingers
Association football midfielders
Association football forwards
Superettan players
Allsvenskan players
Botola players
Sollentuna FK players
Akropolis IF players
AFC Eskilstuna players
IK Sirius Fotboll players
Ittihad Tanger players